Barnard is a given name and family name.

Barnard may also refer to:

Places

Australia
 Barnard Island Group National Park, a national park in Queensland

Canada
 Mount Barnard (Alsek Ranges), aka Boundary Peak 160, a mountain on the British Columbia-Alaska border
 Mount Barnard (Canada), a mountain on the British Columbia-Alberta border/Continental Divide in the Canadian Rockies
 Barnard Island, an island in the Estevan Group on the North Coast of British Columbia

United Kingdom
 Barnards Green, a popular district centre in Great Malvern, Worcestershire, England

United States
 Barnard, Indiana, an unincorporated community
 Barnard, Kansas, a city
 Barnard, Michigan, an unincorporated community
 Barnard, Missouri, a city
 Barnard, South Dakota, an unincorporated community
 Barnard, Vermont, a town
 Mount Barnard (Alsek Ranges), aka Boundary Peak 160, a mountain on the Alaska-British Columbia border
 Mount Barnard (California), a mountain in California

Astronomy 
 Barnard Catalogue, a list of dark nebulae compiled by Edward Emerson Barnard
 Barnard's Loop, an emission nebula in the constellation of Orion
 Barnard's Galaxy (NGC 6822), a barred irregular galaxy
 Barnard's Star, a red dwarf
 Comet Barnard
 Barnard 1 or D/1884 O1, discovered by Edward Emerson Barnard
 Barnard 2 or 177P/Barnard
 Barnard 3 or 206P/Barnard–Boattini

Other uses 
 Barnard (cyclecar)
 Barnard (lunar crater)
 Barnard (Martian crater)
 Barnard Castle, a castle and its surrounding town in Teesdale, County Durham, England
 Barnard College, of Columbia University, an American independent college of liberal arts and sciences for women
 Barnard's Express, or B.X. Express, a pioneer freight and stagecoach firm in British Columbia
 Barnard's Inn, the current home of Gresham College in Holborn, London, England
 HMS Barnard Castle (renamed Empire Shelter), a Castle-class corvette of the Royal Navy (1944 – 1955)

See also 
 Bernard (disambiguation)
 Bernhard (disambiguation)